COU is an acronym with several meanings:

 Columbia Regional Airport
 Comité Olímpico Uruguayo, the Uruguayan Olympic Committee
 Context of Use, with respect to biomarker-based evidence assessed at the US FDA
 Council of Ontario Universities
 Unidad de Valor Real, a reference currency of Columbia, by ISO 4217 currency code
 Curso de Orientación Universitaria, a  sidancro former Spanish Pre-University academic course.

See also  
 Cou (disambiguation)